Walkabout is a rite of passage in Australian Aboriginal society, during which males undergo a journey during adolescence, typically ages 10 to 16, and live in the wilderness for a period as long as six months to make the spiritual and traditional transition into manhood.

Definition

The term "walkabout" has been used to characterise Indigenous Australians as highly mobile over the short-term.

In the case of Aboriginal Australians, life-cycle stages, such as traditional rites of passage, seem to influence the motivations for movement more than the frequency of movement.

Temporary mobility 
"Temporary mobility" is a nomadic lifestyle that does not establish a permanent residence and includes a significant amount of movement for religious observance. Young Indigenous adults have the highest mobility rate of all age groups in Australia; males make up the majority.

Research on temporary mobility 
Mobility as a topic of research is difficult to track and measure. In 2010s research, professionals identified technology as being a factor of then-current mobility in young Indigenous adults in Australia. However, no formal, sound research has been conducted on this subject matter specifically. The lack of female Indigenous presence in research results has determined that Australian women participate in the national census less than their male counterparts leading to the underrepresentation of women in mobility research. This under-representation in research is due to the fact that most mobility research relies highly on census data as its primary form of data collection. The census occurs on one night nationally, which can make it difficult to track mobility, as does the finding that women in Australia are typically out of their usual residence at night, also leading to the under-representation of women in research.

As of 2008, government statistical measures were not able to provide any detailed indication of the frequency, volume, or direction of Indigenous temporary mobility.

Public perception 
Indigenous temporary mobility practices remain poorly understood within mainstream Australian society. They are often explained away as simply the product of a nomadic predisposition to wander aimlessly.

The potential rise for the complexity of temporary mobility of traditional origins within modernisation is prevalent in current Australian society for the transition of Indigenous cultures from traditional activities toward modernity has given rise to growing recognition of the importance of traditional practices. 

Indigenous temporary mobility in and around remote Australia is due to the spiritual ties of the Indigenous people to the land of the Outback. With modernisation occurring all across Australia, walkabout will occur in more remote areas such as the outback to create a break from modern culture in order to create a connection with traditional, spiritual roots. Interior Australia (Outback) witnesses temporary mobility in those areas due to the lack of permanent residents in those areas. The spiritual attachment of aboriginals to the land of the Outback was a strong, unbreakable force that rooted social groups within their traditional territories.

The physical geography of the Australian Outback has fundamentally shaped indigenous socio-spatial organisation and thus mobility practices. Owing to low population density and the uncharted aura of these areas it is not surprising that the Outback is the typical home to walkabout for aboriginals with ancestral ties to the land.

See also
 Australian Aboriginal culture
 Walkabout, a 1971 film based on a book of the same name
 The Songlines, a book combining fiction and non-fiction by writer Bruce Chatwin
 Australian Walkabout, television series
 Rumspringa, a similar Amish rite of passage
 Walkabout, an episode of the Lost TV series
 Vision quest
 "Walkabout" 1995 Album One Hot Minute references Aboriginal rite of passage in song "Walkabout".

References

Australian Aboriginal culture
Rites of passage